The Agricultural Pavilion (formerly known as the Livestock Judging Pavilion) is a contributing property to the Texas Technological College Historic District on the campus of Texas Tech University in Lubbock, Texas. The Agricultural Pavilion was one of the original buildings on campus and opened in 1926. It served as the home court for Texas Tech basketball teams until 1927 when the gymnasium was completed.

History
The Livestock Judging Pavilion was one of the first four structures Texas Tech built specifically for agricultural education.

References

Defunct college basketball venues in the United States
Texas Tech Red Raiders basketball venues
Texas Tech University buildings
Texas Technological College Historic District
Historic district contributing properties in Texas
National Register of Historic Places in Lubbock County, Texas
Event venues on the National Register of Historic Places in Texas